Shmuel (Seth) Sackett is a religious Zionist leader. He co-founded both the Zo Artzeinu and Manhigut Yehudit ("Jewish Leadership") political movements in Israel.

During the 1990s, Zo Artzeinu opposed the Oslo Accords through civil disobedience. In 1998, Sackett co-founded Manhigut Yehudit with long-time partner Moshe Feiglin.

Sackett was born in the United States, and studied at Touro College in New York City. He was educated in both Talmudic scholarship and secular academic subjects. He had been involved in Jewish youth work, and in Jewish educational outreach to secular Jews, some of whom became baal teshuvas ("returnees to Judaism") under his tutelage. He worked in Wall Street's Financial District before making Aliyah to Israel and settling in the West Bank in 1990.

Sackett had been a member of the JDL in the 1970s, and a loyal follower of Kach leader Rabbi Meir Kahane in the United States. Sackett eventually followed Kahane to Israel, where he joined Kach and, later, Kahane Chai. And became the director of Kahane Chai. After Feiglin's election to the Knesset in 2013, Sackett authored an article on the Manhigut Yehudit website rejecting calls from supporters that he and Feiglin renounce Kahane.  He co-founded Zo Artzeinu with Moshe Feiglin in 1993.

While Sackett was a close friend of Kahane's son, Rabbi Binyamin Ze'ev Kahane, he disagreed with the younger Kahane's tactics. Sackett and Feiglin shared some of Meir Kahane's goals, such as creating a more Jewish and secure Israel (and, like Kahane, advocated the "transfer" of Arabs outside the country), but wished to achieve them via non-violent methods.

Sackett worked as Manhigut's International Director. When Feiglin left Likud and created Zehut Sackett joined him and was chosen 12th on the party list for the April 2019 elections in which the party did not pass the electoral threshold. In the following September 2019 elections he was placed in the 15th and final place in Zehut's candidate list. The party forwent the candidacy before the elections took place.

He has residences in both Woodmere, New York, and Karnei Shomron, a Jewish settlement in the West Bank. He is married, with six children.

Footnotes

External links
Articles by Shmuel Sackett

Living people
American emigrants to Israel
American Jews
American Orthodox Jews
American Kahanists
Israeli Jews
Israeli Orthodox Jews
Israeli Kahanists
Kach and Kahane Chai politicians
People from Woodmere, New York
Year of birth missing (living people)